This is a list of rijksmonuments in Friesland that have articles on the English language Wikipedia.

A

B

C

D

E

F

G

H

I

J

K

L

M

N

O

P

R

S

T

V

W

 
Friesland